ABK Architects (previously Ahrends, Burton and Koralek) is a British architectural practice. It was founded in 1961 by Peter Ahrends (born 1933, Berlin, Germany), Richard Burton (born 1933 in London, United Kingdom, died 2017), and Paul Koralek (born 1933 in Vienna, Austria, died London 2020) after they won first prize in a competition to produce a design for the Berkeley Library at Trinity College Dublin in 1960. ABK was initially established in London in 1961 but has had a base in Dublin since 1996.

In 1982, ABK produced a prize-winning project for the Hampton Extension to the National Gallery, in London. However, it was described by Charles, Prince of Wales as a "monstrous carbuncle on the face of a much-loved and elegant friend". The design was not used for the eventual Sainsbury Wing extension that was later built in 1991.

National Life Stories conducted an oral history interview (C467/119) with Peter Ahrends in 2014 for its Architects Lives' collection held by the British Library. NLS further conducted an oral history interview (C467/117) with Richard Burton in 2014–15 for its Architects Lives' collection held by the British Library.

Architecture 

Buildings designed by ABK include:

 Berkeley Library, Trinity College Dublin (1961–67)
 St Andrew's College, Booterstown, Dublin (1968–72)
 Arts Faculty building, Trinity College, Dublin (1968–79)
 Redcar Library (1971; demolished 2011)
 Additions to Keble College, Oxford on Blackhall Road (1972–80)
 Templeton College, Oxford (1969–96)
 Portsmouth Polytechnic Library (1975–80)
 John Lewis department store, Kingston-upon-Thames, (1979–90)
 Sainsbury's supermarket, Canterbury, Kent (1982–84)
 Hooke Park College, Dorset (1983–90)
 Dover Heritage Centre, Kent (1988–91)
 Whitworth Art Gallery development plan and sculpture court, Manchester (1991–95)
 Docklands Light Railway Beckton Extension and Poplar Bridge, London (1987–93)
 Techniquest Science Discovery Centre, Cardiff (1992–95)
 Selly Oak Colleges Learning Resource Centre, Birmingham (1995–97)
 W. H. Smith headquarters extension, Swindon, Wiltshire (1994–96)
 Waterford Visitor Centre, Ireland (1997–98)
 Dublin Dental Hospital (1995–98)
 Loughborough University Business School and Economics building, Leicestershire (1995–98)
 British Embassy, Moscow, Russia (1993–2000)
 Institute of Technology, Tralee, County Kerry (1996–2001)
 Blanchardstown Institute of Technology, Dublin (1998–2002)
 County Hall, Tullamore, County Offaly (1999–2002)
 Arts building extension, Trinity College, Dublin (2000–02)
 Áras an Chontae, Roscommon, County Roscommon (2015)

See also 
 Prospect 100 best modern Scottish buildings

Further reading 

 Ken Powell. 20th Century Architects - Ahrends, Burton and Koralek. RIBA, 2012.

References

External links 
 ABK Architects website
 Ahrends Burton Koralek: English Architects, e-architect
 

Design companies established in 1961
Architecture firms of England
Companies based in Dublin (city)
1961 establishments in England
Architecture firms of Ireland